Chase Wayne Morison (born 27 November 1992) is a South African professional rugby union player for Munakata Sanix Blues in the Top League in Japan. His can play as a prop or a hooker.

Career

Border

Free State / UFS Shimlas / Griffons

After high school, Morison moved to Bloemfontein, where he joined the  academy. In 2011, he played for the  side in the 2011 Under-19 Provincial Championship and was named in the matchday squad for all thirteen of their matches, starting seven and playing off the bench on five occasions. Free State finished the regular season fourth on the log and qualified for the semi-finals, where they lost to the s.

Morison was named in the  squad, but did not get any game time despite being named on the bench for their match against  in the 2012 Under-21 Provincial Championship. However, he featured prominently in the same competition in 2013, starting ten of their matches as the Free State Under-21s finished in fifth spot, missing out on the semi-finals.

He played in all seven of their matches during the regular season, helping them to maintain an unbeaten record, winning six matches and drawing one. He missed out on the play-offs, where his side won the competition for the first time after beating  63–33 in Bloemfontein.

Morison returned to Bloemfontein and was named in the  squad for the 2015 Currie Cup Premier Division.

References

South African rugby union players
Living people
1992 births
Sportspeople from Germiston
Rugby union props
Rugby union hookers
Free State Cheetahs players
Griffons (rugby union) players
Rugby union players from Gauteng